The 1988 Winter Paralympic Games were the fourth Winter Paralympics, held again in Innsbruck, Austria. These were the last Winter Paralympics to be held in a separate location from the Winter Olympics. Beginning in 1992, the Olympics and the Paralympics were held in the same city or in an adjacent city. These Paralympics were not held at the same Olympic venue in Calgary, Canada, because of financial and recruiting difficulties. A total of 377 athletes from 22 countries took part. The USSR competed for the first and only time. Sit-skiing was introduced as another event in both the Alpine and Nordic skiing competitions. Other sports were biathlon and ice sledge speed racing. Ice sledge speed racer Knut Lundstroem from Norway was the most successful athlete, winning four gold medals in the 100m, 500m, 1000m and 1500m events.

Sports
 Alpine skiing
 Ice sledge speed racing
 Nordic skiing
 Biathlon
 Cross-country skiing

Medal table

The top 10 NPCs by number of gold medals are listed below. The host nation (Austria) is highlighted.

Participating nations
Twenty two nations participated in the 1988 Winter Paralympics. Soviet Union made their debut appearance at the Winter Games.

 (Host nation)

See also

 1988 Winter Olympics
 1988 Summer Paralympics

References

External links

International Paralympic Committee
The event at SVT's open archive 

 
Paralympics, Winter
Paralympics
Winter Paralympic Games
Sports competitions in Innsbruck
Winter multi-sport events in Austria
Winter Paralympics
January 1988 sports events in Europe
1980s in Innsbruck